"Lazy Eye" is the third single from Silversun Pickups' debut album Carnavas, written by lead singer and guitarist Brian Aubert. The band performed the song on the Late Show with David Letterman, The Tonight Show with Jay Leno, Later With Jools Holland, and Last Call with Carson Daly. The song is a playable track on Rock Band 2 and Guitar Hero: World Tour.

An alternate version of the song, with a length of 7:27, was played on XMU before the shorter version was played on FM and other XM channels. This version was featured on their demo CD (which featured early versions of four tracks).

Music video

The music video for "Lazy Eye" was directed by Suzie Vlcek and produced by Eric Morgan. Former band member, Kennedy, makes a cameo appearance in the video as a bartender and the band's original drummer, Elvira Gonzalez, makes a cameo appearance as a box office/door attendant.

The video received extensive airplay on MTV, MTV2, MTVU, VH1, Fuse, MuchMusic, MTV (Latin America), International Music Feed and many other international broadcast outlets. The popularity of the video led to the creation of a VH1 "Pop-Up Video" version. The "Lazy Eye" music video was among the MTV2 Subterranean "Viewers Top 20 Music Videos of 2007" list.

Personnel
 Director: Suzie Vlcek
 Producer: Eric Morgan
 Cinematographer: Joe Pugliese
 Editor: Jonathan Alberts
 Cast: Sara Grace Powell, Hank May, Filippo Almonde
 Cameos: Kennedy, Elvira Gonzalez

Charts

Year-end charts

Certifications

In popular culture
The song was featured in the television series The O.C., Criminal Minds, and Reaper, the 2008 film Prom Night, a promo for Major League Baseball's 2008 All-Star Game, a video package at the end of FOX's coverage of the 2008 World Series, a video package for CBC's 2009 Stanley Cup playoffs, a 2012 New Zealand New World Supermarket advertising campaign and the video games Rock Band 2, Guitar Hero: World Tour, and Forza Horizon.

References

External links
"Lazy Eye" music video on YouTube
Website of Director, Suzie Vlcek
Silversun Pickups on IMVDb
VH1 Pop-Up Video version of "Lazy Eye"

2006 singles
Silversun Pickups songs
2006 songs
Dangerbird Records singles